No More Stories Are Told Today, I'm Sorry They Washed Away // No More Stories, The World Is Grey, I'm Tired, Let's Wash Away, often shortened down to No More Stories..., is the fifth studio album by the Danish band Mew. It was released in Scandinavia on 17 August, the United Kingdom on 24 August, the United States on 25 August, and Japan on 26 August 2009.

No More Stories... is produced by Rich Costey who also produced their breakthrough album Frengers, and is the band's first album as an official three-piece after bass player Johan Wohlert left to spend time with his family, before rejoining the band prior to the release of + -.

According to lead vocalist Jonas Bjerre, this album is happier, "dancier", and more upbeat than its predecessor, And the Glass Handed Kites, which had a dark theme of fear.

Bjerre explained the unusually long title of the album to Gaffa: "We originally wanted a short title for the album but we couldn't find sufficiently redemptive words. The final title is the lyrics to the short intermezzo 'Hawaii Dream', and when Bo [Madsen] suggested that we used the complete text as a title it didn't take him long to convince Silas [Utke Graae Jørgensen] and myself. It was like finding the missing piece in a puzzle".

The opening track, "New Terrain", if played backwards reveals another song entitled "Nervous" which is added as a bonus track to the vinyl edition of the album. The lyrics were posted as a poem on their Danish record company Evil Office's website.

Pre-release
The band released information on a few tracks in interviews. According to SPIN.com, "Cartoons and Macramé Wounds" would be a "challenging five-minute opus" that supposedly reversed the traditional Mew formula of a quiet buildup into an epic by starting out gigantically before fizzling away into something more minimal, and "Beach" was called the band's most straightforward song ever. According to the band, they made a more upbeat album and it would not be one extended suite like the predecessor, And the Glass Handed Kites.

Singles
"Introducing Palace Players", the first single off No More Stories... was first released on their MySpace page on 28 May 2009. It features Swirlies vocalist/guitarist Damon Tutunjian on bass guitar. Other than its inclusion as the lead-off track on the No More Stories EP, it has not been released as a physical single.

The second single from the album, entitled "Repeaterbeater", was posted as Free Mp3 of the Day by Spinner.com on 25 June 2009.

"Beach" was remixed by Trentemøller and released on iTunes as the third single in April 2010.

Each single was accompanied by a music video directed by Martin de Thurah.

An edit of "Sometimes Life Isn't Easy" was released as a single on 3 May 2010.

Critical reception

No More Stories... was met with universal acclaim upon release. The album was extremely well received in the band's native Denmark upon release, getting top scores in reviews from most music magazines, including Gaffa and Soundvenue. Website Metacritic calculated an average score of 79 out of 100 from 17 professional reviews. The A.V. Club gave it an A (the highest note), praising that "Mew really does inhabit a place where few contemporaries can be found." The independent review site Pitchfork Media gave the album an 8.1/10, citing that "Mew has succeeded in developing a good sound from some of the least hip ingredients imaginable", while comparing the album to progressive rock bands of the late 1970s. British music weekly NME gave the album 8/10, going on to say that, "Always inventive, often beautiful and occasionally totally sublime, Mew have always stood out from the pack." Slant Magazine gave the album 3 out of 5 stars, stating that "Mew is not as thoughtful or smart as they think they are, but the force of their conviction is inspiring."

Track listing

Personnel

Mew
Jonas Bjerre – vocals, electric guitars, synthesizers, harmonium, piano, acoustic guitar
 Bo Madsen – electric guitars, acoustic guitar
 Silas Graae – drums, percussion, African percussion, drum programming

Additional
Bastian Juel – bass on all songs except "New Terrain", "Introducing Palace Players" and  "Tricks of the Trade"
Damon Tutunjian – bass on "Introducing Palace Players"
Dr. Nick Watts – additional keyboards on "Introducing Palace Players", "Beach", "Cartoons and Macramé Wounds" and "Reprise"
Nico Muhly – string, piano and piccolo/flute arrangements on "Tricks of the Trade"
Mathias Friis-Hansen – additional percussion on "New Terrain", Kalimba on "Hawaii" and "Vaccine", and marimba on "Vaccine"
Steve Coleman – alto saxophone on "Sometimes Life Isn't Easy"
 Mari Helgerlikova – additional vocals on "Sometimes Life Isn't Easy"
Sellasi Dewornu – additional African percussion on "Hawaii"
Choir on tracks "Introducing Palace Players" and "Cartoons and Macramé Wounds"
 Anne Christine Berggren
 Anni Mogensen
 Nanna Secker Larsch
 Lianna Quarshie
Children's choir on "Silas the Magic Car" and "Sometimes Life Isn't Easy"
 Mia-Marie Olesen
 Maria Bruun
 Fannie Klint
 Solveig Honore
 Mathilde Lerentzen
 Emily Piercy
 Roselil Hansen
 Fritjof Nørretranders
 Sally Risell
 Vera Kwederis

Other
Rich Costey - record producer, mixing
Bob Ludwig - mastering on tracks 2, 6, 7, 14
Ari Marcopoulos - photography
Vlado Meller - mastering
M/M Paris - album cover art and design
Charlie Stavish - engineering, mixing
Mark Santangelo - recording assistant
Alan Mintz and Will Botwin - management
Noah Goldstein and Ben Liscio - mixing

Charts

References

2009 albums
Mew (band) albums
Albums produced by Rich Costey